The betsileo sportive lemur (Lepilemur betsileo) is a sportive lemur endemic to Madagascar. The betsileo sportive lemur is found in eastern Madagascar, living in primary and secondary rainforests .

References

Sportive lemurs
Mammals described in 2006